Gediminas Baravykas  (12 April 1940, Pasvalys – 25 February 1995) was a Lithuanian architect.

Life and career
In 1958 he graduated from the Salome Neris Vilnius Secondary School. He graduated from the State Art Institute of the Lithuanian SSR, after which (1964) he worked at the Institute of Urban Construction Design in Vilnius as an architect, then as a group leader (1970-1975), chief architect of projects (1975-1984), and since 1984 the head of the department. In 1985-1987 he was the chief architect at that institution, and then in 1990-1992 he was the chief architect of the department of the Institute of Urban Construction Design. 

Since 1978 he was a member of the CPSU. 1987-1990 - Chief Architect, Head of the Main Department of Architecture and Urban Planning of the city of Vilnius. Since 1988 - Corresponding Member of the USSR Academy of Arts. He was a People's Deputy of the USSR from the Union of Architects of the USSR. He was a member of the Committee of the Supreme Soviet of the USSR on architecture and construction. From 1992 through 1995 he was head of the Urbis design company.

See also
List of Lithuanian artists

References
 This article was initially translated from the Russian Wikipedia.

1940 births
1995 deaths
People from Pasvalys
20th-century Lithuanian painters